This is a list of NCAA Division I men's basketball tournament bids by school (divided by their current conference affiliation). Schools tabulated in the last table no longer compete at the NCAA Division I level in men's basketball and can no longer participate in the tournament.

The years listed are the last tournament year a school has reached a certain round of the NCAA Division I men's basketball tournament. Because earlier tournaments took place with fewer teams, the years listed are only those in which the school advanced (or received a bye) from an earlier round. For instance, no team is judged to have reached the Elite 8 until the 1951 tournament because the NCAA tournament included only eight teams from the first tournament in 1939 through 1950. Similarly, no team is judged to have reached the Sweet 16 until the 1953 tournament because the tournament included 16 or fewer teams before 1953.

Some schools have NCAA tournament appearances under previous names. For example, UTEP was known as Texas Western when it won its NCAA title in 1966.

Additional notes:
 Opening round wins count as a win in the NCAA tournament.
 Appearances by a school that has forfeited its appearances after the fact are still shown here.
 The conference total of tournament bids is based on the number of tournament appearances by current members of the conference; not on the actual number of appearances by a conference irrespective of changes in membership. While the bids by conference depicted amount is a good reflection on historic performance by the current membership, the amount does not accurately depict a conference's historical performance in the tournament.
 The 2020 tournament was canceled due to the COVID-19 pandemic.

The lists are updated through the 2022 NCAA Division I men's basketball tournament, the most recently held to date. They also reflect the following changes for the 2022–23 and 2023–24 seasons:
 2022–23
 California Baptist and North Alabama became eligible for this tournament but neither qualified.
 Dixie State changed its institutional name to Utah Tech.
 Hartford plays its final Division I season, playing as an independent.
 The Northeast Conference lost two members and gained another: Bryant to the America East Conference in non-football sports, Mount St. Mary's to the Metro Atlantic Athletic Conference (MAAC), and Stonehill from Division II.
 Queens (NC) joined the ASUN Conference and Texas A&M–Commerce came to the Southland Conference, both also from Division II.
 The Colonial Athletic Association (CAA) lost a member and gained four: James Madison to the Sun Belt Conference in sports other than field hockey, lacrosse, and men's soccer, Hampton and, other than football, North Carolina A&T from the Big South, Monmouth from the MAAC, and Stony Brook from America East.
 The Missouri Valley Conference lost one member and gained three. Loyola Chicago moved to the Atlantic 10 Conference, while the MVC picked up Belmont and Murray State from the Ohio Valley Conference, plus the University of Illinois Chicago (UIC) from the Horizon League.
 The Ohio Valley lost three members and gained the same number. Austin Peay moved to the ASUN, while Belmont and Murray State joined the Missouri Valley. Little Rock arrived from the Sun Belt, along with Lindenwood and Southern Indiana from Division II as well.
 The Sun Belt gained Marshall and Southern Miss, and regained Old Dominion from Conference USA (C-USA) earlier instead of 2023–24.
 The WAC also lost two members and gained two: Chicago State became an independent, Lamar returned to Southland after one season in the WAC, Southern Utah from the Big Sky Conference, and UT Arlington rejoined from the Sun Belt.

 2023–24
 BYU leaves the West Coast Conference (WCC) for the Big 12.
 Conference USA (C-USA) loses six and gain four: Alabama Birmingham (UAB), Florida Atlantic, North Carolina Charlotte (Charlotte), North Texas, Rice, and Texas San Antonio (UTSA) to the American Athletic Conference (American); Jacksonville State and Liberty from the ASUN; and New Mexico State and Sam Houston from the Western Athletic Conference (WAC).
 Hartford joins Division III's Commonwealth Coast Conference.
 Campbell transfers from the Big South to the CAA.
 The American brings in six members and gives up three: Cincinnati, Houston, and UCF to the Big 12 and Charlotte, Florida Atlantic, North Texas, Rice, UAB, and UTSA from C-USA.
 The ASUN's Jacksonville State and Liberty leave for C-USA.
 The Big 12 takes in Cincinnati, Houston, and UCF from the American alongside BYU.
 The WAC yields New Mexico State and Sam Houston to C-USA.

Bids by conference
Note that these figures represent the total bids received by each current member of the conference, and does not necessarily reflect the number of years that a conference was represented in the tournament. All information is current through the 2021–22 season.

American Athletic Conference

America East Conference

Atlantic 10 Conference

Atlantic Coast Conference

ASUN Conference

Big 12 Conference

Big East Conference

Big Sky Conference

Big South Conference

Big Ten Conference

Big West Conference

Colonial Athletic Association

Conference USA

Horizon League

Ivy League

Metro Atlantic Athletic Conference

Mid-American Conference

Mid-Eastern Athletic Conference

Missouri Valley Conference

Mountain West Conference

Northeast Conference

Ohio Valley Conference

Pac-12 Conference

Patriot League

Southeastern Conference

Southern Conference

Southland Conference

Southwestern Athletic Conference

Summit League

Sun Belt Conference

West Coast Conference

Western Athletic Conference

Independents

Non-Division I teams
These are schools which were once Division I programs but which have since either discontinued sponsorship of basketball or dropped to a lower level of competition.

Schools yet to receive bids

Notes

See also
 NCAA Division I men's basketball tournament bids by school
 NCAA Division I women's basketball tournament bids by school
 List of NCAA Division II men's basketball tournament bids by school
 List of NCAA Division III men's basketball tournament bids by school

References

Bids By School And Conference
College men's basketball records and statistics in the United States
NCAA Division I lists
College basketball in the United States lists